Chandgram Union is a union parishad of Bheramara Upazila, in Kushtia District, Khulna Division of Bangladesh. There are 8 villages and 6 mouzas in the union.

References

External links
 

Unions of Khulna Division
Unions of Bheramara Upazila
Unions of Kushtia District